Charlotte Hollands (née Kerwood, born 15 September 1986) is a British sports shooter. She won her first Commonwealth Gold medal at the age of 15 at the 2002 Commonwealth Games. In 2015 World Championship, she was part of the British team that won gold in the team trap event.

Career
Kerwood was born in Cuckfield and her parents are also sports shooters, running Northall Clay Pigeon Club, where Kerwood began shooting at the age of 12.  She won her first Commonwealth Gold medal at the age of 15 at the 2002 Commonwealth Games in Manchester.  In 2002, she also won the women's double trap at the Junior European Championship.

At the 2012 Summer Olympics, she competed in the trap event, but did not make the final.  Her selection was controversial as she was ranked 10 places lower in the world rankings than Abbey Burton who was not selected.  The selection was challenged by Burton but an independent arbiter referred the decision back to British Shooting, who remained steadfast in their original opinion.  She finished in 16th place, not qualifying for the final.

In 2013, Kerwood won the trap event at the World Cup Final event in Abu Dhabi, beating Jana Beckmann in the gold medal match by 11 hits to 10.  It was the first time she'd reached the final of a World Cup Final event, although she had previously qualified to participate at the 2006 and 2007 World Cup Finals.

At the 2014 Commonwealth Games she again won the gold medal, shooting 94 out of 120 clays.

At the 2015 World Championship, she was part of the British team that won gold in the team trap event.  She did not reach the finals in the individual event, although she was part of a 6-person shoot-off to decide the last entrant to the finals.

Unusually, she only uses one gun to shoot with, a hand-made Perazzi 12-bore shotgun.  She still competes at Northall Clay Pigeon Club, and is coached by Ahmed Al Maktoum, himself an Olympic gold medallist.

References

External links

1986 births
British female sport shooters
Commonwealth Games gold medallists for England
Living people
Olympic shooters of Great Britain
People from Cuckfield
Shooters at the 2002 Commonwealth Games
Shooters at the 2006 Commonwealth Games
Shooters at the 2008 Summer Olympics
Shooters at the 2012 Summer Olympics
Shooters at the 2014 Commonwealth Games
Shooters at the 2015 European Games
European Games competitors for Great Britain
Commonwealth Games medallists in shooting
21st-century British women
Medallists at the 2002 Commonwealth Games
Medallists at the 2006 Commonwealth Games
Medallists at the 2014 Commonwealth Games